All India Muslim Jamaat (also known as AIMJ, It is the first historical Sunni Sufi organization formed in India. It was established at the residence of Nabeer Ala Hazrat Mannani Mian on the occasion of 104th Urs-e-Razvi of Imam Ahmed Raza of Sunni Markaz Dargah Ala Hazrat Bareilly in Uttar Pradesh. Maulana Shahabuddin Razvi bareilvi is the Presedent of this organisation. Organization aim is to promote Sufism, create awareness about education and maintain brotherhood.

Activity 
All India Muslim Jamaat openly supported the Government of India's decision to ban PFI through a press conference.

On the first day of Urs Razvi, a meeting was held at Dargah Ala Hazrat located at the 'Islamic Research Center', which was presided over by Maulana Shahabuddin Razvi Bareilvi, National President of All India Muslim Jamaat.  In this meeting, intellectuals and ulema from different states of the country discussed in detail the issues of Muslims.  In this, a "Muslim agenda" was also prepared taking stock of the actions of Muslims, governments and various political parties.

Kerala, Arif Mohammad Khan released the book "Mufti Azam on unke Khulfa" written by AIMJ President Shahabuddin Razvi at Circuit House Bareilly.

Reference 

Islamic organisations based in India
Sunni organizations
Sunni Islam in India
Memorials to Ahmed Raza Khan Barelvi